Allan Levine (born February 10, 1956) is a Canadian author from Winnipeg, Manitoba, known mainly for his award-winning non-fiction and historical mystery writing.

Life and works
Levine attended the University of Manitoba and the University of Toronto; he got a PhD in Canadian history from Toronto in 1985. His graduate thesis on the grain business in Winnipeg was turned into his first book in 1987, at which point he was teaching and freelancing as a journalist. He is an alumnus of Camp Massad of Manitoba.

Levine's non-fiction work Fugitives of the Forest was awarded the Yad Vashem Prize in Holocaust History in the 1999 Canadian Jewish Book Awards. His series of Sam Klein Mysteries followed. In late 2004, Levine toured Germany promoting Die Sünden der Suffragetten, the German translation of his mystery Sins of the Suffragette. On October 2, 2020, the University of Winnipeg announced that Levine was receiving an honorary doctor of laws at the October 23, 2020 convocation.

Published works

1 Scattered Among the Peoples (2002): Short-listed for the McNally-Robinson Manitoba Book of the Year and the Isbister Best Non-Fiction Manitoba Book of the Year

2 Fugitives of the Forest (1998): Winner of the Yad Vashem Prize in Holocaust History, Canadian Jewish Book Awards, 1999 and Short-listed for the McNally-Robinson Manitoba Book of the Year, 1998

3 The Blood Libel (1997): Shortlisted for the Chapters/Books in Canada First novel Award and the Arthur Ellis First Mystery Novel Award.

References

External links
 Personal website
 Bio on the Canadian Writer's Union site

1956 births
Living people
Canadian non-fiction writers
Canadian mystery writers
Jewish Canadian writers
University of Manitoba alumni
University of Toronto alumni
Writers from Winnipeg
Writers of historical mysteries